Chrome (formerly Crome) is an unincorporated community in Glenn County, California. The community lies on Country Road 306. Its zip code is 95963.

References

Unincorporated communities in California
Unincorporated communities in Glenn County, California